Fool for the City is the fifth studio album by English rock band Foghat, released on 15 September 1975. Featuring the band's signature song "Slow Ride", along with the title track, it was the band's first album to go platinum. It was also the first album the band recorded after the departure of original bassist Tony Stevens. Producer Nick Jameson played bass and keyboards on the album, and co-wrote the closing track, "Take It or Leave It", with Dave Peverett. Appearing in the photograph on the back cover of the album, Jameson is not known to have toured with Foghat in support of the album. A new bassist, Craig MacGregor, was recruited shortly after the album's release, but Jameson would continue to produce and record intermittently with the band over the next couple of decades.

The LP was released with two different catalog numbers. The original was released as BR 6959. It was reissued as BRK 6980 in 1978. All issues from 1978–1984 used this catalog number.

Album cover
The album cover shows drummer Roger Earl sitting alone on a soap box fishing down a manhole near 229 East 11th Street (between 2nd and 3rd Avenue) in New York City, near the address of Foghat's American office. The back cover features skeptical bystanders observing Earl's unusual activity and the other members of the band either asking him what he is doing or trying to dissuade him from it. In a 2014 interview, Earl explained how the picture was taken:

Track listing
Side one
"Fool for the City" (Dave Peverett) – 4:33
"My Babe" (Bobby Hatfield, Bill Medley) – 4:35
"Slow Ride" (Peverett) – 8:14

Side two
"Terraplane Blues" (Robert Johnson) – 5:44
"Save Your Loving (For Me)" (Peverett, Rod Price) – 3:31
"Drive Me Home" (Peverett) – 3:54
"Take It or Leave It" (Peverett, Nick Jameson) – 4:49

Personnel

Foghat
Lonesome Dave Peverett – lead vocals, rhythm guitar
Rod "The Bottle" Price – lead and acoustic guitars, slide guitar, steel guitar, vocals
Roger Earl – drums, percussion
Nick Jameson – bass guitar, keyboards, guitar, vocals, producer, engineer

Production
Tony Loew – photography
Tony Outeda – co-ordinator

Charts
Album

Singles — Billboard (United States)

Certifications

References

External links
Info at Foghat.com
231 E 11th St on Google Maps

1975 albums
Foghat albums
Bearsville Records albums
Rhino Records albums